The Washington Park Historic District is a  historic district located in the borough of North Plainfield in Somerset County, New Jersey. It was added to the National Register of Historic Places on April 9, 1987, for its significance in architecture, landscape architecture, and community planning. Featuring houses built from 1868 to 1917, the district includes 145 contributing buildings.

History and description
The district is in a residential area of North Plainfield, bordered by the Stony Brook, the Green Brook, and Grove Avenue. The houses display a variety of Late Victorian styles. The house at 11 Rockview Avenue was built in the 1860s as a Downingesque "Swiss" cottage. The houses at 12 and 16 Rockview Avenue were built 1882–1894 and feature Late Victorian Eclectic style. The house at 32 Rockview Avenue was built 1882–1894 with Second Empire style and features a mansard roof. The Church of the Holy Cross, an Episcopal Church, was built 1868–1869 with Carpenter Gothic style.

See also
 National Register of Historic Places listings in Somerset County, New Jersey

References

External links
 
 
 

North Plainfield, New Jersey
National Register of Historic Places in Somerset County, New Jersey
Historic districts on the National Register of Historic Places in New Jersey
New Jersey Register of Historic Places